Kloster Lehnin, or just Lehnin, is a municipality in the German state of Brandenburg.

Overview
Kloster Lehnin was established on 1 April 2002 by the merger of 14 villages:

The centre of the municipality is Lehnin. It is best known for Lehnin Abbey, the oldest monastery in the Margraviate of Brandenburg, established in 1180 by Margrave Otto I. The adjacent settlement developed about 1415 out of a market held by the monks outside the abbey walls.

Today, this well-maintained area includes the renovated monastery church and other Gothic buildings.

In addition to tourism, Kloster Lehnin's local economy is supported primarily by 
the Evangelical Deaconess House Berlin Teltow Lehnin, a hospital network 
Hansa-Heemann AG, a mineral water and soft drinks company 
Grand River Enterprise, a cigarette company 
Windeck, a metal construction company. 
All of these companies are established in the industrial area, Rietz.

Demography

Notable people
 Roland Kaiser (1943–1998), actor
 Waltraud Kretzschmar (1948–2018), handball player
 Wolfgang Schmidt (*1966), serial killer

Photogallery

See also
Klostersee
Lehnin Abbey

References

Localities in Potsdam-Mittelmark